Gabriela Dabrowski and Rohan Bopanna won the mixed doubles tennis title at the 2017 French Open, defeating Anna-Lena Grönefeld and Robert Farah in the final, 2–6, 6–2, [12–10].

Martina Hingis and Leander Paes were the defending champions, but lost in the first round to Katarina Srebotnik and Raven Klaasen.

Seeds

Draw

Finals

Top half

Bottom half

References

External links
2017 French Open – Doubles draws and results at the International Tennis Federation

mixed
2017 ATP World Tour
2017 WTA Tour
2017